Heterogenella is a genus of wood midges in the family Cecidomyiidae. The twelve described species are found in the Holarctic and Oriental realms. The genus was established by Boris Mamaev in 1963.

Species
Heterogenella aurita (Fedotova, 2004)
Heterogenella bigibbata Mamaev & Berest, 1991
Heterogenella californica Jaschhof, 1997
Heterogenella cambrica (Edwards, 1938)
Heterogenella finitima Mamaev, 1998
Heterogenella hybrida Mamaev, 1963
Heterogenella linearis Yukawa, 1971
Heterogenella mamajevi Yukawa, 1967
Heterogenella minuta Jaschhof, 2009
Heterogenella puberula (Li & Bu, 2001)
Heterogenella transgressoris Jaschhof, 1998
Heterogenella transversa Li & Bu, 2002

References

Cecidomyiidae genera

Taxa named by Boris Mamaev
Insects described in 1963